Snoopy and the Red Baron is an Atari 2600 shoot 'em up featuring Peanuts character Snoopy and his aviation rival, the Red Baron. It is the first video game based on Peanuts by Charles M. Schulz and was published by Atari, Inc. in 1983.

Gameplay
Snoopy and the Red Baron is a single-player game with the player guiding Snoopy on his doghouse with four variations of difficulty to play. The objective is to shoot down Snoopy's rival, the Red Baron, controls being the stick to maneuver Snoopy and the button to fire. The game starts out with the player having four doghouses, otherwise known as lives. It takes eight hits to destroy the Red Baron, and eight hits from the Red Baron to have the player lose a doghouse.

An alternative notion is to collect "treats" the Red Baron drops while falling, and to avoid skulls and crossbones. Touching the skulls and crossbones or being shot down will undo the player's progress in collecting treats. If the player collects all of the treats and downs all of the Red Barons, bonus points are rewarded. A Gold Baron is earned when the player downs fifty Red Barons.

In the game, the Red Baron often flies above the clouds; however, Snoopy cannot fly above the clouds in the play set. An exclamation mark appears whenever one million points are scored.

Release
Snoopy and the Red Baron was released in 1983. This game play-tested better than the Atari 2600 game Bugs Bunny, therefore Bugs Bunny was shelved, allowing Snoopy and the Red Baron to enter the market. The game was released with a Children's Computer Workshop cartridge label, which was used on very few games for the Atari 2600. Snoopy and the Red Baron was the only released game in Atari, Inc.'s Peanuts series, having a planned but unreleased game titled Good Luck, Charlie Brown.

References

Atari 2600 games
Atari 2600-only games
1983 video games
Shoot 'em ups
Video games based on Peanuts
Video games developed in the United States
World War I video games
Atari games
North America-exclusive video games
Single-player video games
Video games about dogs